ER Piotrków is a radio tower in Piotrków Pierwszy, Poland with a height of 105 m (344 ft.).   

The base of the antenna sits at an altitude of 282 m (925.2 ft.) above sea level. The tower stands at 105 m (344 ft.), while the antenna systems are suspended at 110 m (360.9 ft.) above ground level. The tower broadcasts radio station Radio eR Lublin.

External links
 eR Piotrków RadioPolska.pl

Towers in Poland
Buildings and structures in Lublin

Radio masts and towers